is the fifth single of the Hello! Project group W, released on May 18, 2005.

Track listing 
 
 
 Ai no Imi o Oshiete! (Instrumental)

External links 
 Up-Front Works discography entries: CD, DVD
 Projecthello.com lyrics: Ai no Imi wo Oshiete!, Jinx

W (group) songs
Zetima Records singles
2005 singles
Song recordings produced by Tsunku
2005 songs